Wallis and Matilda are an Australian group that interpret the works of Australian bush poet, Banjo Paterson.

Discography

Studio albums

Compilation albums

Charting singles

References

Australian folk music groups
Musical groups established in 1980